The Lord Clyde-class ironclads were a pair of wooden-hulled armoured frigates built for the Royal Navy in the 1860s. They were designed by Sir Edward Reed and built to make use of the large stocks of seasoned timber available in the royal shipyards.

Overview 
Both ships were built with a beam equal to Royal Oak, and some twenty feet shorter.

It was believed at the time that the 15-inch Dahlgren guns carried by the American monitors would fail to penetrate this sandwich.

Notes

Footnotes

References

External links

Ironclad classes
 
Ship classes of the Royal Navy
 Lord Clyde-class ironclad